Edward Barkas (21 November 1901 – 24 April 1962) was an English professional footballer who played as a full back. He played in the Football League First Division for Huddersfield Town, Birmingham and Chelsea.

Barkas was born in Wardley, County Durham. He won two league championship medals and a runners-up medal in the 1928 FA Cup Final with Huddersfield before becoming manager Leslie Knighton's first signing for Birmingham, where he made nearly 300 appearances and won another FA Cup runners-up medal, in 1931. On leaving Birmingham Barkas followed Knighton to Chelsea, returning to the Midlands on the outbreak of the Second World War.

He came from a footballing family: his brother Sam played for and captained England, a cousin, Billy Felton, also played for England, and three other brothers Tommy, James and Harry were professional footballers. He died in Little Bromwich, Birmingham, at the age of 60.

Honours
Huddersfield Town
 Football League First Division: 1923–24, 1924–25
 FA Cup finalist: 1927–28
Birmingham
 FA Cup finalist: 1930–31

References

1901 births
1962 deaths
Footballers from Gateshead
English footballers
Association football fullbacks
Bedlington United A.F.C. players
South Shields F.C. (1889) players
Norwich City F.C. players
Huddersfield Town A.F.C. players
Birmingham City F.C. players
Chelsea F.C. players
English football managers
Barkas family
FA Cup Final players